Víctor Rabu (1834 – 24 March 1907) was a French architect.

Career
He was an exponent of eclectical historicism. He built a notable number of churches in Uruguay, for that reason he was known as "The Lord of the Churches":
 Iglesia de los Conventuales (1867)
 Capilla Jackson (1870)
 Iglesia San Francisco (1870)
 Iglesia de los Vascos (1870)
Some important public buildings were of his authorship, such as the side wings of the Solís Theatre, or the Dámaso Larrañaga Asylum. He also built several private buildings for wealthy families.

References

Further reading
 
 
 

1834 births
1907 deaths
People from Agen
French expatriates in Uruguay
19th-century French architects
Uruguayan architects